LeRoy Gardner, Jr.  (May 11, 1947 – September 6, 2008) was a collegiate basketball player and college professor.  At 6'4", he played guard for the University of Minnesota from 1966 to 1969.

Gardner, As young man, was a playground basketball legend. As the community lore goes that as a 14-year-old, he Ralph Mitchell (19) and Tommy Miller (19) beat (then) University of Minnesota basketball players Lou Hudson, Don Yates and Archie Clark in a pickup game at St. Paul's Oxford Park. Gardner went on to play for St. Paul Central High School from 1962 to 1965 and  helped take the team to its first state tournament berth in years. He scored 41 points in a region semifinal and 33 points in a consolation  title game. He was recruited by legendary coach John Kundla and was the first African American man born and raised in Minnesota to receive a  full basketball scholarship at the University of Minnesota. Gardner earned undergraduate and master's degrees in psychology at the University of Minnesota.
After his playing career was over, he remained at Minnesota and was an academic adviser in the athletic department when he was 
caught up in the scandal involving NCAA rules violations in the late  1980s. Football coach Lou Holtz, Gardner said, had given him $500 for  a football player.  Gardner alleged that he was told "point-blank to lie," but when the time came to talk to NCAA investigators, he told the truth.
Years after the scandal, Gardner returned to the University and was a professor in the General College department, focusing on multicultural relations. Gardner, 61, was diagnosed with lung cancer in December 2007 and died September 6, 2008 at Our Lady of Good Counsel in St. Paul, Minnesota. Gardner was married to Claudia Wallace-Gardner for 27 years. They had four children. He was a spiritual man and loved his family. He loved fishing and later in life took up golfing. He was a regular at Theodore Wirth Golf Course in Minneapolis and enjoyed the outdoors immensely. He is missed by a wide community of former students, family, colleagues, and friends.

References

1947 births
2008 deaths
American men's basketball players
Basketball players from Saint Paul, Minnesota
Guards (basketball)
Minnesota Golden Gophers men's basketball players